Johann Nepomuk Hummel (14 November 177817 October 1837) was an Austrian composer and virtuoso pianist. His music reflects the transition from the Classical to the Romantic musical era. He was a pupil of Mozart, Salieri and Clementi. He also knew Beethoven and Schubert.

Life

Early life

Hummel was born as an only child (which was unusual for that period) in Pressburg, Kingdom of Hungary (now Bratislava, Slovakia). He was named after the Czech patron saint John of Nepomuk. His father, Johannes Hummel, was the director of the Imperial School of Military Music in Vienna; his mother, Margarethe Sommer Hummel, was the widow of the wigmaker Josef Ludwig. The couple married just four months beforehand.

Hummel was a child prodigy. At the age of eight, he was offered music lessons by the classical composer Wolfgang Amadeus Mozart, who was impressed with his ability. Hummel was taught and housed by Mozart for two years free of charge and made his first concert appearance at the age of nine at one of Mozart's concerts.

Hummel's father then took him on a European tour, arriving in London where he received instruction from Muzio Clementi and where he stayed for four years before returning to Vienna. In 1791 Joseph Haydn, who was in London at the same time as young Hummel, composed a sonata for Hummel, who gave its first performance in the Hanover Square Rooms in Haydn's presence. When Hummel finished, Haydn reportedly thanked the young man and gave him a guinea.

The outbreak of the French Revolution and the following Reign of Terror caused Hummel to cancel a planned tour through Spain and France. Instead, he returned to Vienna, giving concerts along his route. Upon his return to Vienna he was taught by Johann Georg Albrechtsberger, Joseph Haydn, and Antonio Salieri.

At about this time, young Ludwig van Beethoven arrived in Vienna and also took lessons from Haydn and Albrechtsberger, thus becoming a fellow student and a friend. Beethoven's arrival was said to have nearly destroyed Hummel's self-confidence, though he recovered without much harm. The two men's friendship was marked by ups and downs, but developed into reconciliation and mutual respect. Hummel visited Beethoven in Vienna on several occasions with his wife Elisabeth and pupil Ferdinand Hiller. At Beethoven's wish, Hummel improvised at the great man's memorial concert. It was at this event that he made friends with Franz Schubert, who dedicated his last three piano sonatas to Hummel. However, since both composers had died by the time of the sonatas' first publication, the publishers changed the dedication to Robert Schumann, who was still active at the time.

Career

In 1804, Hummel became Konzertmeister to Nikolaus II, Prince Esterházy's estate at Eisenstadt. Although he had taken over many of the duties of Kapellmeister because Haydn's health did not permit him to perform them himself, he continued to be known simply as the Konzertmeister out of respect to Haydn, receiving the title of Kapellmeister, or music director, to the Eisenstadt court only after the older composer died in May 1809. He remained in the service of Prince Esterházy for seven years altogether before being dismissed in May 1811 for neglecting his duties. He then returned to Vienna where, after spending two years composing, he married the opera singer Elisabeth Röckel in 1813. The following year, at her request, was spent touring Russia and the rest of Europe. The couple had two sons. The younger, Carl (1821–1907), became a well-known landscape painter. The older, worked as pianist, conductor and composer; he moved to the U.S. and died in Troy, New York. He was at Beethoven's funeral as a pallbearer.

Hummel later held the positions of Kapellmeister in Stuttgart from 1816 to 1818 and in Weimar from 1819 to 1837, where he formed a close friendship with Goethe, learning among other things to appreciate the poetry of Schiller, who had died in 1805. During Hummel's stay in Weimar he made the city into a European musical capital, inviting the best musicians of the day to visit and make music there. He brought one of the first musicians' pension schemes into existence, giving benefit concert tours when the retirement fund ran low. Hummel was one of the first to agitate for musical copyright to combat intellectual piracy.

In 1825, the Parisian music-publishing firm of Aristide Farrenc announced that it had acquired the French publishing rights for all future works by Hummel. In 1830, Hummel gave three concerts in Paris; at one of them, a rondo by Hummel was performed by Aristide Farrenc's wife, the composer Louise Farrenc, who also "sought Hummel's comments on her keyboard technique."

In 1832, at the age of 54 and in failing health, Hummel began to devote less energy to his duties as music director at Weimar. In addition, after Goethe's death in March 1832 he had less contact with local theatrical circles and as a result found himself in partial retirement from 1832 until his death in 1837.

Last years and legacy 

At the end of his life, Hummel saw the rise of a new school of young composers and virtuosi, and found his own music slowly going out of fashion. His disciplined and clean Clementi-style technique, and his balanced classicism, opposed him to the rising school of tempestuous bravura displayed by the likes of Liszt. Composing less and less, but still highly respected and admired, Hummel died peacefully in Weimar in 1837. A freemason (like Mozart), Hummel bequeathed a considerable portion of his famous garden behind his Weimar residence to his masonic lodge. His grave is in the Historical Cemetery, Weimar.

Although Hummel died famous, with a lasting posthumous reputation apparently secure, he and his music were quickly forgotten at the onrush of the Romantic period, perhaps because his classical ideas were seen as old-fashioned. Later, during the classical revival of the early 20th century, Hummel was passed over. Like Haydn, whose musical revival had to wait until the second half of the 20th century, Hummel was overshadowed by Mozart and especially Beethoven. Due to a rising number of recordings, such as by the Hyperion and Naxos labels, and an increasing number of live performances, his music is now becoming reestablished in the classical repertoire.

Notable students include Ferdinand Hiller and Alexander Müller.

Music 

Hummel's music took a different direction from that of Beethoven. Looking forward, Hummel stepped into modernity through pieces like his Sonata in F-sharp minor, Op. 81, cherished by Robert Schumann, and his Fantasy, Op. 18, for piano. These pieces are examples where Hummel may be seen to both challenge the classical harmonic structures and stretch the sonata form.

His main oeuvre is for the piano, on which instrument he was one of the great virtuosi of his day. He wrote eight piano concertos, a double concerto for violin and piano, ten piano sonatas (of which four are without opus numbers, and one is still unpublished), eight piano trios, a piano quartet, a piano quintet, a wind octet, a cello sonata, two piano septets, a mandolin concerto, a mandolin sonata, a Trumpet Concerto in E major written for the keyed trumpet (usually heard in the more convenient E-flat major), a "Grand Bassoon Concerto" in F, a quartet for clarinet, violin, viola, and cello, four hand piano music, 22 operas and Singspiels, masses, and much more, including a variation on a theme supplied by Anton Diabelli for part 2 of Vaterländischer Künstlerverein.

Although thought of in terms of the piano in modern times, Hummel was seriously and constantly interested in the guitar, and he was talented with the instrument. He was prolific in his writing, and his compositions for it begin with opus 7 and finish with opus 93. Other guitar works include Opp. 43, 53, 62, 63, 66, 71 and 91, which are written for a mixture of instruments.

Hummel's output is marked by the conspicuous lack of a symphony. Of his eight piano concertos the first two are early Mozartesque compositions (S. 4/WoO 24 and S. 5) and the later six were numbered and published with opus numbers (Opp. 36, 85, 89, 110, 113, and posth.)

A full list of Hummel's works is available online.

Influence 

While in Germany, Hummel published A Complete Theoretical and Practical Course of Instruction on the Art of Playing the Piano Forte (1828), which sold thousands of copies within days of its publication and brought about a new style of fingering and of playing ornaments. Later 19th century pianistic technique was influenced by Hummel, through his instruction of Carl Czerny who later taught Franz Liszt. Czerny had transferred to Hummel after studying three years with Beethoven. Liszt himself idolized  the work  and influence of Hummel and often performed his works.

Hummel's influence can also be seen in the early works of Frédéric Chopin and Robert Schumann, and the shadow of Hummel's Piano Concerto in B minor as well as his Piano Concerto in A minor can be particularly perceived in Chopin's concertos. This is unsurprising, considering that Chopin must have heard Hummel on one of the latter's concert tours to Poland and Russia, and that Chopin kept Hummel's piano concertos in his active repertoire. Harold C. Schonberg, in The Great Pianists, writes "...the openings of the Hummel A minor and Chopin E minor concertos are too close to be coincidental". In relation to Chopin's Preludes, Op. 28, Schonberg says: "It also is hard to escape the notion that Chopin was very familiar with Hummel's now-forgotten Op. 67, composed in 1815 – a set of twenty-four preludes in all major and minor keys, starting with C major".

Robert Schumann also practiced Hummel (especially the Sonata in F-sharp minor, Op. 81), and considered becoming his pupil. Liszt's father Adam refused to pay the high tuition fee Hummel was used to charging (thus Liszt ended up studying with Czerny). Czerny, Friedrich Silcher, Ferdinand Hiller, Sigismond Thalberg, and Adolf von Henselt were among Hummel's most prominent students. He also briefly gave some lessons to Felix Mendelssohn.

References 
Notes

Sources
 
 

Further reading
 Johann Nepomuk Hummel: Der Mensch und Künstler. Karl Benyovszky, Breslau: Eos-Verlag 1934.
 Zwischen Klassik und Klassizismus. Johann Nepomuk Hummel in Wien und Weimar. Anselm Gerhard, Laurenz Lütteken (editors), Kassel: Bärenreiter 2003.
 
 Lorenz, Michael: "Maria Eva Hummel. A Postscript", Vienna 2013
 Kapellmeister Hummel in England and France. Joel Sachs, Detroit: Information Coordinators 1977.
 Johann Nepomuk Hummel und Weimar. Komponist, Klaviervirtuose, Kapellmeister 1778–1837. Kurt Thomas, Weimar: Rat der Stadt 1987
 Dieter Zimmerschied. Die Kammermusik Johann Nepomuk Hummels. Mainz 1966.
 Dieter Zimmerschied. Thematisches Verzeichnis der Werke von Johann Nepomuk Hummel. Hofheim am Taunus: Hofmeister 1971.

External links 

 
 
 The Hummel Project, biographical information, videos, audio samples and scores, information on performances of Hummel's works
 
 Hummel Gesellschaft Weimar (Hummel society in Weimar) (German)
 Hummel's House in Marienstrasse 8, Weimar Official website of the Hummel House (owned by the Lückhoff Institute)
 musicalics.com 
 8notes biography and commentary
 Compactdiscoveries article on Hummel's relation to Chopin 
 Hummel on Hyperion Records; many of the individual CD pages have a further link to sound samples and/or the CD booklet notes.
 Hummel medallion by David d'Angers, 1834.
 Hummel notes written in Japanese by Mikio Tao
 , animated score

1778 births
1837 deaths
18th-century Austrian people
18th-century classical composers
18th-century classical pianists
18th-century keyboardists
18th-century Austrian male musicians
19th-century Austrian people
19th-century classical composers
19th-century classical pianists
19th-century keyboardists
19th-century male musicians
Austrian Classical-period composers
Austrian classical pianists
Austrian Freemasons
Austrian male classical composers
Austrian Romantic composers
Composers for piano
Composers for the classical guitar
Honorary Members of the Royal Philharmonic Society
Male classical pianists
Musicians from Bratislava
Pupils of Antonio Salieri
Pupils of Johann Georg Albrechtsberger
String quartet composers